John Rex (5 March 1925 – 18 December 2011) was a South African-born British sociologist. Born in Port Elizabeth, he was radicalised after working for the South African Bantu Affairs Administration and moved to Britain.  He was a lecturer at the universities of Leeds (1949–62) (where he was a leading left-wing activist), Birmingham (1962–64), Durham (1964–70), Warwick (1970–79 and 1984–90), Aston (1979–84), Toronto (1974–75), Cape Town (1991) and New York (1996).  He was also a member of the UNESCO International Experts' Committee on Racism and Race Prejudice (1967) and president of the International Sociological Association's Research Committee on Racial and Ethnic Minorities (1974–82).

Academic work
His academic work involved the analysis of conflict as a key problem of both society and sociological theory. His 1961 book, Key Problems of Sociological Theory, was his first major work where conflict was claimed to be more realistic than the past British functionalist theories of social order and system-stability.  He is also known for his studies of race and ethnic relations. He analyzed the classic tradition of sociology, including Karl Marx, Max Weber, Georg Simmel and Émile Durkheim in his book Discovering Sociology (1973).

He was a professor emeritus at Warwick University.
Theory and practice was for him always a dynamic issue and led to his demands for "objective" research and comment while being a political radical involved in the UK's Campaign for Nuclear Disarmament (CND) and the New Left Review.

Publications

Books
His book publications include:
  (reprint Taylor & Francis, 1970)
Race, Community and Conflict: a study of Sparkbrook, with R.S.Moore, OUP 1967 
Discovering Sociology, 1973
Race, Colonialism and the City, 1973

Apartheid and Social Research, ed., Paris: UNESCO 1981
Social Conflict - A Theoretical and Conceptual Analysis, 1981
The Ghetto and the Underclass, Aldershot, 1987
Ethnic Minorities and the Modern Nation State London 1996

Articles
His articles include:
"Ethnic and Race Issues", 1996 (in: Youth and Social Work on the Move, ed. by Amesberger, Schörghuber and Krehan, in: European Union Congress Report, published by the Institute of Sports Sciences of the University of Vienna, Austria.

On John Rex

Abbas, Tahir and Frank Reeves, Immigration and Race Relations: Sociological Theory and John Rex, 2007

Notes

Academics of Aston University
Academics of Durham University
Academics of the University of Birmingham
Academics of the University of Leeds
Academics of the University of Warwick
Academic staff of the University of Toronto
British sociologists
South African sociologists
Campaign for Nuclear Disarmament activists
1925 births
2011 deaths
People from Port Elizabeth
South African emigrants to the United Kingdom